or  is a junior officer rank in the militaries of some Hispanophone and Lusophone countries.

However, today the rank is often translated as ensign, sub-lieutenant or second lieutenant.

During that time  was the leader of the retinue of a king or high-ranking nobleman.

Argentina
In Argentina, the rank of alférez is used by both the air force and the gendarmerie.  It is, however, used differently in the two services.  The air force uses the rank for newly qualified officers, while the gendarmerie uses alférez ranks as an equivalent for the army's "lieutenant" ranks.

The other armed forces of Argentina do not use the rank of ensign.

Chile
In Chile, an officer cadet is known as a sub-alférez. On graduating from officer training, he becomes an alférez for a year while carrying out training specific to his branch. After this, the alférez is promoted to sub-lieutenant.

Peru
Frigate alférez is the lowest naval officer rank.

Philippines
The rank of Alférez, locally spelled as Alpéres, was also used by the Philippine Revolutionary Army during the Philippine Revolution and Philippine-American War. It is the lowest commissioned officer rank and is interchangeable with second lieutenant (Spanish: Segundo Teniente) (Tagalog: Ikalawang Tenyente) on the service.

Spain
 is the lowest officer rank in Spain, immediately below lieutenant.

Dominican Republic
Alférez is used in the Dominican Navy, with frigate alférez (second lieutenant) and ship alférez (first lieutenant) being the lowest naval officer ranks.

Venezuela
"Alférez" in Venezuela's Armed Forces is the last rank of a cadet in the three land academies of officers: Army, Air Force and National Guard. The naval academy uses for its last rank "midshipman" or "guardiamarina".

Gallery

Army insignia

References

Military ranks
Military ranks of Argentina